Thawan Duchanee (September 27, 1939 – September 3, 2014) was a Thai contemporary painter, architect and sculptor with an international reputation. In 2001, this notable artist was  given the prize by the Office of the National Culture Commission of Thailand as the National Thai Artist in Fine art and Visual art.

Thawan was raised in Chiang Rai, Thailand and started art studies at the age of fifteen at the Art and Craft College under the scholarship of the Ministry of Education of Thailand. In 1958, he furthered his studies at Painting, Sculpture and Graphic arts department, Silpakorn University.

Biography

Early life and education 

Thawan appeared to be prodigiously gifted artist since he was a child. In his youth, he had a consuming passion for Buddhism. His attitude toward his work, however, had been changed since he belonged to the last generation of Silpa Bhirasri’s students at Silpakorn University. Thawan got good grades from his drawing works with his drawing works in university all along but he earned a low grade in Silpa’s drawing class. The reason his teacher gave to him is ‘your fish have no fishy smell, your bird can’t fly through the air, your horse can’t be ridden or rushed. You are just a copier not an actual artist’.  Since then, Thawan started to work in a different way and became an outstanding student.

Illness and death 

After three months hospitalizations because of complications from hypertension and diabetes. Thawan died of liver failure on September 3, 2014 at the age of 74.

The funeral  was held at Wat Debsirindrawas in Bangkok. The honoured cremation was bestowed by the Her Royal Highness Princess Maha Chakri Sirindhorn.

Work philosophy 

Buddhist references have played an important role in Thawan’s works. According to one of notable works, a series of Ramayana paintings he presented all of the characters in his own interpretation. Thawan earned a worldwide reputation as a Thai contemporary artist from these buddhist painting. 
 
“Art is beyond nature and intellect” Thawan said. He gave priority to human artistic creativity  in artworks.

Style and media 

Thawan was the first engraver using a new technique. He used special ballpoint pen to create engravings containing millions of strokes. After working in this way for a while,a doctor suggested him to stop because the way he worked had a disastrous effect on his health. 
 
Thawan also created the painting by Zen brush in order to present a Zen philosophy in artistic form.

The unique characteristic of Thawan’s painting including not only form and religious story but also the colour he used. After learning about Chinese, Indian and Japanese artworks which characteristic is monochrome painting, He was  inspired to paint in black and white in order to precisely express inner feelings. 
 
Thawan is not only famous for his paintings but also architecture. His architectural masterpiece is the Black House. It was the residence for Thawan for the rest of his life.

List of major works

Paintings 

 The Dhammapada 
 The Battle of Mara 
 The Last Ten Lives of the Buddha 
 Seeing what is Visible

Buildings 
 Buddhist Meditation Room 
 The Biggest Work of the Painter is not a Painting

Critical responses 

His artworks are not widely accepted in the first place. A group of student demonstration destroyed his works because they considered them as religious insults. His paintings, however, eventually are mastered and valued as can be seen nowadays.

His artworks has been compared with the artworks of Chalermchai Kositpipat, a fellow-Chiang Rai junior artist. There is a saying "Chalerm Sawan, Thawan Narok" (เฉลิมสวรรค์ ถวัลย์นรก; "Chalerm the Heaven, Thawan the Hell"), because Chalermchai's works focus on elevating the mind, cleanliness, Buddhism or spiritual stories. While Thawan's works are powerful, focusing on the dark side or passion in the human mind.

References

1939 births
2014 deaths
Thawan Duchanee
Thawan Duchanee
Thawan Duchanee
Thawan Duchanee